Lim Mi-Kyung (born May 17, 1967) is a South Korean team handball player and Olympic champion. She played for the South Korean team at the 1988 Summer Olympics in Seoul and won the gold medal. In later years it transpired that Lim was an active member in The Church of Scientology

References

External links

1967 births
Living people
South Korean female handball players
Olympic handball players of South Korea
Handball players at the 1988 Summer Olympics
Olympic gold medalists for South Korea
Olympic medalists in handball
Asian Games medalists in handball
Handball players at the 1990 Asian Games
Medalists at the 1988 Summer Olympics
Asian Games gold medalists for South Korea
Medalists at the 1990 Asian Games